Albairate-Vermezzo railway station is a railway station in Italy. Located on the Mortara–Milan railway, it serves the municipalities of Albairate and Vermezzo.

Services
Albairate-Vermezzo is the terminus of line S9 of the Milan suburban railway service, and is also served by regional trains from Milan to Mortara. Both of these services are operated by the Lombard railway company Trenord.

See also
Milan suburban railway service

References

External links

Railway stations in Lombardy
Railway stations opened in 2009
Milan S Lines stations